Chamaecrista absus (syn. Cassia absus), the pig's senna or tropical sensitive pea, is a species of flowering plant in the family Fabaceae, with a worldwide distribution in the tropics and subtropics. An annual herb reaching , it is a common weed of cultivated and waste places, and its seeds are regularly harvested and sold for use in traditional medicine in Africa and Asia.

Subtaxa
The following varieties are accepted:
Chamaecrista absus var. absus – entire range
Chamaecrista absus var. meonandra  - Arizona, Mexico, Honduras

References

absus
Flora of Cape Verde
Flora of West Tropical Africa
Flora of West-Central Tropical Africa
Flora of Northeast Tropical Africa
Flora of East Tropical Africa
Flora of South Tropical Africa
Flora of Namibia
Flora of the Northern Provinces
Flora of Swaziland
Flora of Yemen
Flora of Iran
Flora of the Indian subcontinent
Flora of Indo-China
Flora of Hainan
Flora of Western Australia
Flora of the Northern Territory
Flora of Queensland
Flora of Arizona
Flora of Mexico
Flora of Guatemala
Flora of Honduras
Flora of Jamaica
Flora of the Netherlands Antilles
Flora of Aruba
Flora of the Windward Islands
Flora of Venezuela
Flora of western South America
Flora of North Brazil
Flora of Northeast Brazil
Flora of West-Central Brazil
Flora of Paraguay
Plants described in 1982